Charles Gilbert Bergerson (July 19, 1910 – October 18, 1987) was an American football player who played in the National Football League from 1932 to 1936.  He played college football for Oregon State University and played for three NFL teams in 39 games over 4 seasons.

References

External links

1910 births
1987 deaths
People from Columbia County, Oregon
Sportspeople from Corvallis, Oregon
American football defensive linemen
Oregon State Beavers football players
Chicago Bears players
Chicago Cardinals players
Brooklyn Dodgers (NFL) players
Players of American football from Oregon